Sam Vincent (born 1963), is an American basketball player and former coach.

Sam or Samuel Vincent is also the name of:

Sam Vincent (voice actor) (born 1971), Canadian voice actor
Sam Vincent, creator of Humans (TV series)
Sam Vincent, character in Black Light (novel) and Pale Horse Coming
Sam Vincent (athlete), participated in Athletics at the 2013 Canada Summer Games
Samuel Vincent (captain), involved in Action of August 1702
Sam Vincent, author of Blood & Guts